Tomosvaryella cilitarsis is a species of fly in the family Pipunculidae.

Distribution
Belgium, Great Britain, Czech Republic, Estonia, Finland, Germany, Italy, Latvia, Lithuania, North European Russia, Spain, Sweden, Switzerland, Netherlands.

References

Pipunculidae
Insects described in 1910
Diptera of Europe
Taxa named by Gabriel Strobl